The 1977 Five Nations Championship was the forty-eighth series of the rugby union Five Nations Championship. Including the previous incarnations as the Home Nations and Five Nations, this was the eighty-third series of the northern hemisphere rugby union championship. Ten matches were played between 15 January and 19 March.

 won the championship for the sixth time outright. Including shared titles this was France's tenth championship overall. France won the Grand Slam for the second time and did so with the same fifteen players in all four matches (a unique feat for a Grand Slam winner) and without conceding a try. England, in 1913, are the only other Grand Slam winners not to concede a try. France also registered the lowest points total, 58, of any Grand Slam winner in the four point-try era (1972–92).  won the Triple Crown for the second consecutive season and the fourteenth time overall, equalling England's record of Triple Crown wins. They were the first Triple Crown winners to finish as runners-up in the championship.

The third game of the tournament — France v. Wales in Paris — was the subject of the 1978 film Grand Slam; the ending had to be rewritten when Wales unexpectedly lost.

Participants
The teams involved were:

Table

Squads

Results

References

External links

The official RBS Six Nations Site

Six Nations Championship seasons
Five Nations
Five Nations
Five Nations
Five Nations
Five Nations
Five Nations
 
Five Nations
Five Nations
Five Nations